The 2016 Norwegian Football Cup was the 111th season of the Norwegian annual knock-out football tournament. It began with qualification matches in March 2016. The first round was played on 13 April 2016 and the tournament concluded with the final on 20 November 2016.

The victory would have earned Rosenborg a place in the second qualifying round of the 2017–18 UEFA Europa League, but since the club already had qualified to the 2017–18 UEFA Champions League as winners of the 2016 Tippeligaen, this berth was passed down to Haugesund, fourth-place finishers in the league.

Calendar
Below are the dates for each round as given by the official schedule:

Source:

First round

Second round

Third round

Fourth round

Quarter-finals

Semi-finals

Final

Scorers

5 goals:

 Thomas Lehne Olsen - Tromsø
 Mustafa Abdellaoue - Aalesunds
 Henrik Kjelsrud Johansen - Odds
 Kwame Karikari - Haugesund
 Patrick Pedersen - Viking

4 goals:

 Magnus Nikolaisen - Alta
 Geir André Herrem - Åsane
 Jens Petter Hauge - Bodø/Glimt
 Fabian Ness - Moss
 Pål André Helland - Rosenborg
 Magnus Stamnestrø - Rosenborg
 Vegard Lysvoll - Tromsdalen
 Deshorn Brown - Vålerenga

3 goals:

 Fitim Azemi - Bodø/Glimt
 Mathias Normann - Bodø/Glimt
 Trond Olsen - Bodø/Glimt
 Shuaibu Ibrahim - Haugesund
 Filip Kiss - Haugesund
 Ingolfur Örn Kristjansson - Herd
 Joachim Magnussen - Hødd
 Árni Vilhjálmsson - Lillestrøm
 Amahl Pellegrino - Mjøndalen
 Mushaga Bakenga - Molde / Rosenborg
 Thomas Amang - Molde
 Johnny Furdal - Nest-Sotra
 Ole Jørgen Halvorsen - Odds
 Bentley - Odds
 Kjell Rune Sellin - Sandefjord
 Kent Håvard Eriksen - Sandnes Ulf
 Ohi Omoijuanfo - Stabæk
 Agon Mehmeti - Stabæk
 Tokmac Nguen - Strømsgodset

2 goals:

 Wilhelm Pepa - Arendal
 Niklas Lerpold - Åsane
 Sindre Mauritz-Hansen - Asker
 Jan Aubert - Bærum
 Martin Wiig - Bodø/Glimt
 Vadim Manzon - Bodø/Glimt
 Milan Jevtović - Bodø/Glimt
 Magnus Grødem - Bryne
 Robert Vikestad - Charlottenlund
 Ludvig Begby - Fredrikstad
 Ramon Carvalho - Gjøvik-Lyn
 Mesut Can - Grorud
 Fisnik Kastrati - Grorud
 Torbjørn Agdestein - Haugesund
 Eirik Mæland - Haugesund
 Andreas Rekdal - Herd
 Michael Karlsen - Hødd
 Robert Vikestad - Jerv
 Martin Ellingsen - Kongsvinger
 Adem Güven - Kongsvinger
 Benjamin Stokke - Levanger
 Ståle Steen Sæthre - Lysekloster
 Kittiphong Pluemjai - Nest-Sotra
 Borgar Velta - Notodden
 Oliver Berg - Odds
 Fredrik Midtsjø - Rosenborg
 Matthías Vilhjálmsson - Rosenborg
 Péter Kovács - Sandefjord
 Erik Mjelde - Sandefjord
 Vidar Nisja - Sandnes Ulf
 Pontus Engblom - Sandnes Ulf
 Steffen Ernemann - Sarpsborg 08
 Pål Alexander Kirkevold - Sarpsborg 08
 Patrick Mortensen - Sarpsborg 08
 Fredrik Flo - Sogndal
 Atle Horvei - Sparta Sarpsborg
 Moussa Njie - Stabæk
 Lars-Jørgen Salvesen - Start
 Robert Sandnes - Start
 Lasse Sigurdsen - Start
 Jørgen Sollihaug - Stjørdals-Blink
 Markus Brændsrød - Strømmen
 Marcus Pedersen - Strømsgodset
 Nikolai Andersen - Tønsberg
 Mikael Ingebrigtsen - Tromsø
 Christer Johnsgård - Tromsø
 Sofien Moussa - Tromsø
 Kristoffer Ødemarksbakken - Ull/Kisa
 Elías Már Ómarsson - Vålerenga
 Vajebah Sakor - Vålerenga
 Mats Anguish Vågnes - Vard Haugesund
 Martin Torgersen - Vestfossen
 Andreas Westly - Vidar
 Øyvind Gausdal - Vindbjart
 Victor Vindfjell - Vindbjart

1 goals:

 Sondre Brunstad Fet - Aalesunds
 John Arne Riise - Aalesunds
 Felix Adrian Jacobsen - Alta
 Øyvind Veseth Olsen - Alta
 Runar Overvik - Alta
 Mathias Abelsen - Alta
 Vegard Braaten - Alta
 Steffen Vindal - Åsane
 Peter Aase - Åsane
 Joakim Hammersland - Åsane
 Mathias Raum - Åsane
 Kristoffer Stephensen - Åsane
 Joachim Soltvedt - Åsane
 Even Bydal - Asker
 Behajdin Celina - Asker
 Axel Harstad - Asker
 Stian Stray Molde - Asker
 Niklas Solhaug - Asker
 Martin Vestreng - Aurskog-Høland
 Emanuel Kot Chol Tafesse - Bærum
 Emmanuel Amarh - Bærum
 Didrik Fredriksen - Bærum
 Jonas Tekle - Bærum
 Patrick Berg - Bodø/Glimt
 Joachim Osvold - Bodø/Glimt
 Henrik Furebotn - Bodø/Glimt
 Thomas Aarsund - Brattvåg
 Jan Philip Berglund - Brattvåg
 Eirik Høivik - Brattvåg
 Lamine Larbi Nekrouf - Brattvåg
 Hakon Aalma - Brumunddal
 Mads Bøgild - Bryne
 Bjørnar Holmvik - Bryne
 Robert Undheim - Bryne
 Andreas Hanssen - Byåsen
 Arne Gunnes - Byåsen
 Asgeir Snekvik - Byåsen
 John Christoffer Brekke - Charlottenlund
 Óscar - Egersunds
 Robin Hjelmseth - Elverum
 Victor Edvardsen - Elverum
 Sondre Liseth - Fana
 Christian Heimark - Fana
 Joachim Dankertsen - Fana
 Marius Wichne - Fana
 Andreas Løvland - Finnsnes
 Jonas Simonsen - Finnsnes
 Simen Reksten Solheim - Florø
 Ali Alaskari - Fram Larvik
 Markus Naglestad - Fram Larvik
 Erik Rosland - Fram Larvik
 Sanel Kapidžić - Fredrikstad
 Kristian Brix - Fredrikstad
 Patrik Karoliussen - Fredrikstad
 Erik Tønne - Fredrikstad
 Kim Brenna - Funnefoss/Vormsund
 Ole Christian Moltzau - Funnefoss/Vormsund
 Bjarne Langeland - Fyllingsdalen
 Rubén Alegre - Gjøvik-Lyn
 Øyvind Henriksveen - Gjøvik-Lyn
 Trond Brynestad - Godøy
 Zirak Ahmed - Grorud
 Morten Slorby - Grorud
 Derrick Mensah - Haugesund
 William Troost-Ekong - Haugesund
 Tor Arne Andreassen - Haugesund
 Magnus Myklebust - Hødd
 Jakob Bergman Hole - Holmen
 Durim Muqkurtaj - Hønefoss
 Kristoffer Hay - Hønefoss
 Michael Ogungbaro - Jerv
 Jacob Toft - Jerv
 Emil Ekblom - KFUM Oslo
 John Olav Norheim - KFUM Oslo
 Dennis Obeng - KFUM Oslo
 Robin Rasch - KFUM Oslo
 Stian Sortevik - KFUM Oslo
 Håkon Aarvaag - KIL/Hemne
 Miloš Vučenović - Kirkenes
 Jonas Mannsverk - Kirkenes
 Jens Aslaksrud - Kjelsås
 Espen Garnås - Kjelsås
 Jesper Solli - Kjelsås
 Henrik Schia - Kongsberg
 Lars Petter Streitlien - Kongsvinger
 Ørjan Røyrane - Kongsvinger
 Fredrik Mani Pålerud - Kongsvinger
 Maikel Nieves - Kongsvinger
 Adrian Thun - Korsvoll
 Daouda Bamba - Kristiansund
 Amidou Diop - Kristiansund
 Sabri Khattab - Kvik Halden
 Almir Taletović - Kvik Halden
 Deniz Kaili - Kvik Halden
 Bendik Bye - Levanger
 Jo Sondre Aas - Levanger
 Joakim Vatne - Lillehammer
 Erik Sigtbakken - Lillehammer
 Mark Botten - Lillehammer
 Bassel Jradi - Lillestrøm
 Erik Brenden - Lillestrøm
 Mohamed Ofkir - Lillestrøm
 Imad Ouhadou - Lørenskog
 Øyvind Mellum - Løten
 Tommy Gaustad - Lysekloster
 Thomas Helland - Lysekloster
 Baste Jonassen - Lysekloster
 Hans-Christian Nysæther - Lysekloster
 Petrit Zhubi - Lysekloster
 Adrian Olsen Teigen - Mo
 Alf Jakob Aano - Madla
 Jonathan Lindseth - Mjøndalen
 Michael Stilson - Mjøndalen
 Ousseynou Boye - Mjøndalen
 Mohamed Elyounoussi - Molde
 Petter Strand - Molde
 Sander Svendsen - Molde
 Pape Paté Diouf - Molde
 Bajram Ajeti - Moss
 Youssef Chaib - Moss
 Thomas Klaussen - Moss
 Espen Eide Nilsen - Mjølner
 Martin Johnsen - Nardo
 Martin Lundal - Nardo
 Sander Sevaldsen - Nardo
 Joakim Solem - Nardo
 Lars Arne Togstad - Nardo
 Mats Walberg - Nest-Sotra
 Adnan Círak - Nest-Sotra
 Sebastian Holmqvist - Nest-Sotra
 Gudmundur Hafsteinsson - Notodden
 Jim Johansen - Notodden
 Semming Nygård - Nybergsund
 Jarl André Storbæk - Nybergsund
 Vegard Bergan - Odds
 Fredrik Oldrup Jensen - Odds
 Joakim Våge Nilsen - Odds
 Mats Ulvund Paulsberg - Oppsal
 Shåresh Ahmadi - Oppsal
 Stian Lunde - Os
 Marius Mikkelsen - Os
 Joe Lunde - Østsiden
 Faton Hoti - Østsiden
 Thomas Elsebutangen - Pors Grenland
 Atle Thommesen - Pors Grenland
 Georg Flatgård - Ranheim
 Mads Reginiussen - Ranheim
 Kim Riksvold - Ranheim
 Runar Fløysvik - Riska
 Knut Haugland - Riska
 Riku Riski - Rosenborg
 Guðmundur Þórarinsson - Rosenborg
 Elbasan Rashani - Rosenborg
 Johan Lædre Bjørdal - Rosenborg
 Yann-Erik de Lanlay - Rosenborg
 Olaus Jair Skarsem - Rosenborg
 Jonas Svensson - Rosenborg
 Jørgen Skjelvik - Rosenborg
 Tore Reginiussen - Rosenborg
 Christian Gytkjær - Rosenborg
 Geir Ludvig Fevang - Sandefjord
 Eirik Offenberg - Sandefjord
 André Sødlund - Sandefjord
 Håvard Storbæk - Sandefjord
 Kevin Larsen - Sandefjord
 Abdoulaye Seck - Sandefjord
 Marius Helle - Sandnes Ulf
 Alexy Bosetti - Sarpsborg 08
 Ole Hansen - Sarpsborg 08
 Tobias Heintz - Sarpsborg 08
 Matti Lund Nielsen - Sarpsborg 08
 Kristoffer Tokstad - Sarpsborg 08
 Tor Øyvind Hovda - Sarpsborg 08
 Amani Mbedule - Sarpsborg 08
 Jonas Lindberg - Sarpsborg 08
 Preben Yttergård Hanssen - Senja
 Sondre Laugsand - Senja
 Adrian Mikkelsen - Senja
 Uros Vucenovic - Senja
 Svenn Johansen - Skjervøy
 Rune Bolseth - Sogndal
 Ruben Holsæter - Sogndal
 Kristian Fardal Opseth - Sogndal
 Babacar Sarr - Sogndal
 Thomas Mathiesen - Sparta Sarpsborg
 Mustafa Hassan - Skeid
 Kristoffer Rasmussen - Sola
 Leutrim Leo Fejzi - Sotra
 Luc Kassi - Stabæk
 Giorgi Gorozia - Stabæk
 Shadrach Eghan - Stabæk
 Kamal Issah - Stabæk
 Birger Meling - Stabæk
 Jeppe Moe - Stabæk
 Chidiebere Nwakali - Start
 Rolf Daniel Vikstøl - Start
 Kristoffer Ajer - Start
 Mathias Rasmussen - Start
 Erlend Segberg - Start
 Eirik Wichne - Start
 Vegard Fiske - Stjørdals-Blink
 Tom-Rune Hønnås - Stjørdals-Blink
 Anders Nygaard - Stjørdals-Blink
 Nedzad Šišić - Stjørdals-Blink
 Simen Grov - Stord Sunnhordland
 Mats Ingebrigtsen - Strindheim
 Fredrik Lund - Strindheim
 Stian Torgersen - Strindheim
 Madiou Konate - Strømmen
 Aleksander Melgalvis - Strømmen
 Markus Nakkim - Strømmen
 Olav Øby - Strømmen
 Espen Rødsand - Strømmen
 Abdul-Basit Agouda - Strømsgodset
 Tommy Høiland - Strømsgodset
 Petter Vaagan Moen - Strømsgodset
 Martin Rønning Ovenstad - Strømsgodset
 Øyvind Storflor - Strømsgodset
 Lars-Christopher Vilsvik - Strømsgodset
 Francisco Júnior - Strømsgodset
 Mathias Eriksen - Tønsberg
 Thomas Utter Jensen - Tønsberg
 Jonas Johansen - Tønsberg
 Mathias Johnsen - Tromsdalen
 Thomas Kristoffersen - Tromsdalen
 Tor Martin Mienna - Tromsdalen
 Mohammed Ahamed - Tromsdalen
 Magnus Andersen - Tromsø
 Kent-Are Antonsen - Tromsø
 Jostein Gundersen - Tromsø
 Fredrik Michalsen - Tromsø
 Runar Espejord - Tromsø
 Morten Aaker Øien - Tynset
 Jesper Andreasson - Ull/Kisa
 Thomas Braaten - Ull/Kisa
 Jonas Fjeldberg - Ull/Kisa
 Ole Kristian Langås - Ull/Kisa
 Felix Horn Myhre - Ullern
 Dan Mönell - Valdres
 Niklas Castro - Vålerenga
 Simen Juklerød - Vålerenga
 Henrik Udahl - Vålerenga
 Ghayas Zahid - Vålerenga
 Erlend Drivenes - Vard Haugesund
 Mikal Olsen Hebnes - Vardeneset
 Eirik Anfinsen - Varegg
 Petter Ingebrigtsen - Varegg
 Kristoffer Valsvik - Varegg
 Nicklas Sjølie Af Geijerstam - Vestsiden-Askøy
 Marius Haugland Ravnanger - Vestsiden-Askøy
 Sander Flåte - Vidar
 Eirik Jakobsen - Vidar
 Carl-Henrik Refvik - Vidar
 Vegard Aasen - Vidar
 Ingvald Sandvik Halgunset - Vidar
 Sigve Kleppa Christensen - Vidar
 Martin Høyland - Vigør
 Aniekpeno Udoh - Viking
 Suleiman Abdullahi - Viking
 Samuel Adegbenro - Viking
 Mathias Bringaker - Viking
 Jesper Jansen - Vindbjart
 Preben Skeie - Vindbjart

Own goals:
 Mads Granheim - Stord Sunnhordland (12 April 2016 vs Haugesund)
 Erlend Dahl Reitan - Rosenborg (25 May 2016 vs Nest Sotra)
 Marius Berg - Kongsberg (13 April 2016 vs Strømsgodset)
 Jørgen Hammer - KFUM Oslo (27 April 2016 vs Gjøvik-Lyn)

References

 
Norwegian Football Cup seasons
Cup
Norwegian Football Cup